Clitocybula is a genus of mushroom-forming fungi in the family Marasmiaceae. The genus was circumscribed by Georges Métrod in 1952. Species in the genus are commonly known as "coincaps".

Description
Clitocybula fruit bodies are small- to medium-sized, with a morphology ranging from clitocyboid, collybioid, mycenoid, pleurotoid, to omphalinoid. Gills are decurrent, and the stipe is cylindrical and equal in width throughout its length. Clitocybula spores are smooth, ellipsoid to roughly spherical in shape, hyaline (translucent), and mostly amyloid (staining with Melzer's reagent).

Species

See also

List of Agaricales genera
List of Marasmiaceae genera

References

Marasmiaceae
Agaricales genera